Pollo Del Mar or Pollo DelMar born as Paul E. Pratt, and alternately known as The Notorious P.D.M. or The Glamazon is a San Francisco-based American drag queen performer, professional wrestling personality, comic, emcee, journalist, activist, philanthropist and singer. Within the Imperial Council of San Francisco, she is the 53rd Empress of San Francisco. 

As columnist, blogger and celebrity interviewer, Del Mar hosts two podcasts  and contributes to a wide array of print and online media outlets, both gay and straight. He was the final Miss Trannyshack, was named "San Francisco's Most Notable Drag Queen" at the 2016 Nitey Awards  and is now considered "The Queen of San Francisco Media."

To date, Del Mar has released four dance music singles "How Embarrassing" (2012), "Made You Look" (2013) with Billboard charting artist Kwanza Jones, "#WhiteLadyProblems" (2014) and is featured on the song "Last Night," from the 2017 album Ban2oozle by Billboard Top 5 Dance Chart recording artist and openly gay rapper Jipsta. He is heavily featured in the music video "WannaBe," a cover of The Spice Girls by Billboard Dance chart-topping artist Neon Hitch.

Del Mar established himself as a credible journalist via celebrity interviews on the cover of Northern California's preeminent LGBT entertainment and lifestyles publication GLOSS Magazine (for which he is a three-time covergirl), a long-running weekly column "The Glamazon Diaries" in The San Francisco Bay Times newspaper and "Promosexual" blog for the alternative weekly San Francisco Bay Guardian website, becoming arguably the Bay Area's most widely read drag personality. His work also appeared consistently on Gay.com and, less frequently, in California-based publications such as JustUsBoys and the Spanish-language Adelante. He  contributed celebrity-related content and interviews to The Huffington Post for over a half-decade. Presently Del Mar is a featured contributor to professional wrestling website WrestleZone.com.

Del Mar parlayed celebrity interviews into performances with several top stars and acting, appearing onstage with Katy Perry, Iggy Azalea, Lady Gaga, talk-show hosts Wendy Williams and Ross Mathews and opened for Britney Spears during the singer's appearance on Good Morning America. On Nov. 22, 2008, Del Mar and five others opened the inaugural YouTube Live Concert event with Katy Perry, who performed  chart-topping single "Hot n Cold" for a global audience of millions. On Dec. 6, 2008, he performed with Grammy-winning singer Cyndi Lauper at the Energy 92.7 Anniversary Party. Del Mar performed stand-up comedy during a June 2018 sold-out series of San Francisco shows with Real Housewives of New York star Countess Luann de Lesseps.

As an actor, Del Mar has appeared in independent feature films The Rise and Fall of Jeremy Starr and Devious, Inc., various television programs, has cameos in ABC mini-series When We Rise by Oscar-winning writer Dustin Lance Black, HBO series Looking and is a central character in Northern California pro wrestling organization Wrestling for Charity.

Del Mar made his first drag appearance April 27, 2006 at a fundraiser in San Francisco's Castro District. That same night he received his first paid booking at The Monster Show with Cookie Dough. In August of that year, he placed first runner-up to winner Mercedez Munro in the 2006 Miss Gay San Francisco Pageant and gained further attention as "Miss October" in the award-winning 2007 Desperate Divas calendar and a subsequent series of post cards. Featuring pictures by acclaimed San Francisco photographer Kingmond Young, the projects helped raise more than $25,000 for AIDS Housing Alliance/San Francisco.

Del Mar gained attention for her political efforts in the wake of California passing Prop.8, which would effectively ban gay marriage.

Del Mar is the only performer to win Trannyshack Star Search, Miss Trannyshack, Grand Duchess and Empress of San Francisco.

Miss Trannyshack 2007 
On November 17, 2007, at the San Francisco Gift Center, Del Mar was crowned "Miss Trannyshack 2007" in front of the largest audience in the pageant's 12-year history. Del Mar is in fact the only Miss Trannyshack to ever simultaneously hold the Miss Trannyshack and Miss Trannyshack Star Search titles. Selecting him from the eight contestants was a panel of celebrity judges including comedian Sandra Bernhard, New York City club kid-turned-author James St. James, drag personality and Midnight Mass producer Peaches Christ, KNRG "Energy 92.7 FM" morning show hosts Fernando and Greg in the Morning, the men of Hothouse Videos and "Miss Trannyshack 2004" Anna Conda.

Entering the pageant as the reigning "Miss Trannyshack Star Search 2007," determined annually since 1998 in contests between Trannyshack newcomers, Del Mar became the only performer to ever hold both of the legendary nightclub's drag titles. He became the longest-reigning Miss Trannyshack in the title's 12-year history.

GLOSS Magazine, for which he has worked as a celebrity columnist since November 2006, honored his victory by placing Del Mar on the cover of the March 7, 2008 issue. New York City celebrity photographer Bradford Noble and San Francisco-based photojournalist Steven Underhill provided images for the feature.

Professional Wrestling 
As a journalist, Del Mar has long covered professional wrestling, first for Huffington Post then popular wrestling newsboard WrestleZone. Under his given name, Pratt's work published in the Oct. 2021 issue of industry-leading Pro Wrestling Illustrated Magazine. He became a podcast cohost and contributor to Wrestling Inc. website.

In 2017, she began pursuing a life-long passion for sports entertainment personally, joining San Francisco Bay Area-based promotion Wrestling for Charity. There she is a central personality in live events, acting as Co-General Manager of the company. Behind the scenes, she assumed a role as head booker for WFC's San Francisco events and oversees promotions, marketing and more. 
By 2021, Del Mar's reputation as a pro wrestling personality expanded dramatically. She hosted Effy's "Big Gay Brunch" in Tampa, FL, for Game Changer Wrestling in April 2021.  She returned to "Big Gay Brunch" Chicago later that year. She has also worked for various other wrestling promotions in California.

On July 21, wrestling legend Mickie James announced Del Mar will accompany transgender grappler Jamie Senegal at the Aug. 28 National Wrestling Alliance all-women's pay-per-view EMPOWERRR. 

In Nov. 2021, OutSports announced nominees for its annual Queer Wrestling Index (QWI) Awards, with Del Mar receiving a total of five for work as a journalist and personality under both given and stage names. On Dec. 16, 2021, it was announced OutSports readers and LGBT in the Ring Podcast audiences chose Del Mar as the 2021 "QWI Pro Wrestling Personality of the Year."

Del Mar was afforded a one-page profile in the May 2022 issue of Pro Wrestling Illustrated.

References

External links 
 Pollo Del Mar's Official Facebook Fan Page
 Pollo Del Mar's Huffington Post San Francisco Blog

American bloggers
Living people
American drag queens
Year of birth missing (living people)